Gyalpo (རྒྱལ་པོ) is a term in Tibetic languages that is translated as "king" in English

It may refer to:
Druk Gyalpo, title of the King of Bhutan
Gyalpo of Ladakh, title of the King of Ladakh
Gyalpo Lhosar, the Tibetan New Year and a new year festival of Sherpa people of Nepal
Gyalpo spirits, gods and spirits in Tibetan mythology and religion
Mipham Wanggyur Gyalpo, ruler of Tibet (1604–1613)